Marques (Spanish: Márquez o Marquez) is a Portuguese language surname, of patronymic origin meaning "son of Marcus (Marcos)".
It should not be confused with the Spanish surname Marqués, different from Márquez.

People

Portugal
A. H. de Oliveira Marques, (1933–2007), Portuguese historian
Lourenço Marques (explorer) (fl. 1544), Portuguese trader and explorer
Armando Marques (sport shooter) (born 1937), Portuguese sports shooter
Sérgio Marques (born 1957), Portuguese politician
Hélder da Terra Fragueiro Marques Antunes (born 1963), Portuguese-American executive and former racecar driver
Carlos Marques (born 1983), Portuguese professional footballer
Frederico Marques (born 1986), Portuguese professional tennis coach
Nuno Marques (born 1970), former Portuguese tennis player
Pedro Marques (born 1988), Portuguese professional footballer

Brazil
Ary Marques (born 1955), Brazilian football player and manager
Binho Marques (born 1962), Brazilian politician
Fernando Codá Marques (born 1979), Brazilian mathematician
Anderson Marques (born 1983), Brazilian footballer
Anderson Luís de Azevedo Rodrigues Marques (born 1987), Brazilian footballer
Cláudio Marques (born 1950), Brazilian footballer
Dênis Marques (born 1981), Brazilian football striker
Edson Marques (born 1982), Brazilian futsal player
Gabriel Marques (born 1988), Brazilian footballer
Guilherme Marques (born 1969), Brazilian beach volleyball player
Iorlando Pereira Marques Filho (born 1985), Brazilian footballer
José Roberto Marques (1945–2016), Brazilian footballer
Lucas Marques (born 1988), Brazilian footballer
Maria Marques (born 1976), Brazilian water polo player
Priscila Marques (born 1978), Brazilian judo athlete
Renan Marques (born 1983), Brazilian football player
Ricardo Marques (born 1979), Brazilian professional football referee
Rodrigo Peters Marques (born 1985) Brazilian footballer
Tarso Marques (born 1976), Brazilian racing driver
Wlamir Marques (born 1937), retired Brazilian basketball player
Yane Marques (born 1984), Brazilian modern pentathlon athlete
Ben Marques (born 2008), Brazilian Athlete

Other countries
Rui Marques (born 1977), retired Angolan football
Hugo Marques (born 1986), Angolan footballer
David Marques (1932–2010), English rugby player
Antoine Vermorel-Marques (born 1993), French politician

See also
Marques (disambiguation)

Portuguese-language surnames
Patronymic surnames